The 2010 Tour of Hainan is the fifth edition. The sixth stage was cancelled after a few kilometres of racing because of heavy rains and flash flooding on some of the roads of the stage.

Stages

Stage 1
11 October 2010 – Sanya, 85,2 km

Stage and General classification after Stage 1

Stage 2
12 October 2010 – Sanya to Wuzhishan, 167.5 km

Stage 3
13 October 2010 – Wuzhishan to Xinglong, 146.4 km

Stage 4
14 October 2010 – Xinglong to Wenchang, 162,9 km

Stage 5
15 October 2010 – Wenchang to Haikou, 156,8 km

Stage 6
16 October 2010 – Haikou to Chengmai, 164,6 km

The stage was cancelled.

Stage 7
17 October 2010 – Chengmai to Danzhou, 172,8 km

The organisation decided to shorten the stage because of heavy rainfalls. The race was started only 64 km before the original finish.

Stage 8
18 October 2010 – Danzhou to Dongfang, 194,6 km

Kenny van Hummel crossed the finishline first to win his fourth stage, but the jury relegated him, and Markov became the winner.

Stage 9
19 October 2010 – Dongfang to Sanya, 226,1 km

Leadership classification

Final standings

General classification

Teams classification

Points classification

Mountains classification 

Tour of Hainan
Tour of Hainan
Tour of Hainan